Chester Leonard "Chet" Anderson Jr. (March 14, 1945 – March 14, 2007) was a professional American football tight end in the National Football League (NFL).

References

External links
 NFL.com profile

1945 births
2007 deaths
American football tight ends
Minnesota Golden Gophers football players
Pittsburgh Steelers players
Sportspeople from Grand Rapids, Minnesota
Players of American football from Minnesota